Lotfi Bouchouchi (Arabic: لطفي بوشوشي, born 1964 in Algiers) is an Algerian filmmaker and producer.

Biography 
Bouchouchi graduated from the École supérieure de cinéma de Paris. He made his debut in the audiovisual field as first assistant to directors Merzak Allouache and Mohamed Chouikh. He has worked for the French media group TF1, French television channel France 24 and Canadian television network APTN1.

His 2015 directorial feature debut The Well was selected as the Algerian entry for the Best Foreign Language Film at the 89th Academy Awards but did not make the nomination. Nevertheless, the film participated in multiple international film festivals and won numerous awards.

In 2021, Bouchouchi received funding from the Doha Film Institute for the production of a television series, Dar El Malika. The same year, he began shooting his new feature film The Station.

Partial filmography

Feature films (as director) 
 2015: The Well (Le puits)

References

External links 
 

Algerian filmmakers

Algerian film producers

Living people

1964 births